Donald Ray Tapia (born January 12, 1938) is an American businessman who served as the United States Ambassador to Jamaica from 2019 until 2021.

Early life
Tapia was born on January 12, 1938 in Detroit, Michigan. He was raised in poverty primarily by his mother after his father left the family. After graduating from high school, Tapia joined the United States Air Forces and served from 1955–1959.

Career

Political Campaign
Tapia ran as an Independent for Mohave County Supervisor in 1980, while a resident of Lake Havasu City, Arizona. He lost in the General Election to incumbent Republican Supervisor Jerry Holt by a wide margin.

Business Career & Philanthropy
Tapia served as Chairman and CEO of the Essco Group Management, an electrical production company, for over 30 years.
Tapia also served on the Board of Directors for the Sun Angel Foundation and Endowment at Arizona State University, the Tau Kappa Epsilon Educational Foundation the Board of Indianapolis, and as Chairman of Board and Trustee at Saint Leo University.

U.S. Ambassador to Jamaica
US President Donald Trump nominated Tapia to serve as United States Ambassador to Jamaica, succeeding Luis Moreno.

References

Living people
Ambassadors of the United States to Jamaica
Arizona Republicans
People from Detroit
21st-century American diplomats
United States Air Force officers
Saint Leo University alumni
1938 births